Archeological Site 4 SLO 834, also known as CA-SLO-834, is a prehistoric archaeological site in Atascadero, California. The site, which is on the west bank of the Salinas River, was discovered by Charles Dills in 1977. Archaeologist Robert Gibson conducted excavations at the site in 1978 and found hammerstones, hand axes, a hearth, pestles, projectile points, scrapers, and stone debris. As a result of this excavation, Gibson determined that the site had been inhabited between 1,500 and 2,000 years prior.

References

History of San Luis Obispo County, California
Atascadero, California
Salinas River (California)
Santa Lucia Range
Archaeological sites on the National Register of Historic Places in California
National Register of Historic Places in San Luis Obispo County, California